Huanjiang Maonan Autonomous County is an ethnic Maonan autonomous county in the north of Guangxi, China, bordering Guizhou province to the north and northwest. It is under the administration of Hechi city. It is the only Maonan autonomous county in China.

Climate

References

County-level divisions of Guangxi
Administrative divisions of Hechi
Autonomous counties of the People's Republic of China